Precis is a genus of nymphalid butterflies that Jacob Hübner described in 1819. They are commonly known as commodores and are found in Africa. Two species are endemic to Madagascar.

Description
Precis are medium-to-large butterflies (wingspan up to 5 cm). The upperside ground colour is black with white, pink, green, or blue spots and bands, the upperside may also have a brownish ground colour. The wings often have eyespots. The outer wing margins are wavy and toothed or scalloped. Several species occur in multiple colour forms (morphs). They tend to have distinct rainy-season and dry-season forms, that of the gaudy commodore being the most extreme. Transitional forms are also known.

Biology
Precis are savannah species. They are good fliers. The larvae feed on Lamiaceae.

Taxonomy
The genus Precis is closely allied to Junonia. The two genera differ in the structure of their genitalia and larval food plant choice. The type species of the genus is Precis octavia.

Species
Listed alphabetically:
 Precis actia Distant, 1880 — air commodore
 Precis andremiaja Boisduval, 1833
 Precis antilope (Feisthamel, 1850) — darker commodore
 Precis archesia (Cramer, [1779]) — garden inspector or garden commodore
 Precis ceryne (Boisduval, 1847) — marsh commodore
 Precis coelestina Dewitz, 1879 — ocellated commodore
 Precis cuama (Hewitson, 1864) — paler commodore
 Precis eurodoce (Westwood, 1850) — Madagascar commodore
 Precis frobeniusi Strand, 1909 — toothed commodore
 Precis limnoria (Klug, 1845) — white-spotted commodore
 Precis milonia C.&R.Felder, [1867] — broad-banded commodore
 Precis octavia (Cramer, [1777]) — gaudy commodore
 Precis pelarga (Fabricius, 1775) — fashion commodore
 Precis rauana (Grose-Smith, 1898) — montane commodore
 Precis sinuata Plötz, 1880 — wide-banded commodore
 Precis tugela Trimen, 1879 — African leaf butterfly, dry-leaf butterfly or eared commodore

Incertae sedis
 Precis permagna Martin, 1920

References 

Seitz, A. Die Gross-Schmetterlinge der Erde 13: Die Afrikanischen Tagfalter. Plate XIII 51 et seq.

External links
 Images representing Precis at EOL

Junoniini
Butterfly genera
Taxa named by Jacob Hübner